Adrian Gleeson (born 30 April 1967) is a former Australian rules footballer who played for Carlton in the Victorian Football League (VFL).

Gleeson, who played as a rover, finished eighth in the 1988 Brownlow Medal count, in his third season of league football.

Wearing the number 12 guernsey, Gleeson debuted for the Blues in round seven of 1986 in the 40-point victory over Collingwood in what was the last game between these two fierce rivals played at Victoria Park.

He was recruited from the Koroit Football Club in the Hampden Football League and was a member of Carlton's 1987 premiership team

Gleeson played 176 games and kicked 174 goals between 1986 and 1996.  He was a popular player at Carlton and coach David Parkin described the decision to delist Gleeson at the end of the 1996 season as one of the toughest of his coaching career.

He was rewarded with life membership of the club and was later appointed to the Carlton Board of Directors in May 2006.

References

External links

Profile at Blueseum

1967 births
Living people
Australian rules footballers from Victoria (Australia)
Carlton Football Club players
Carlton Football Club Premiership players
Koroit Football Club players
Victorian State of Origin players
One-time VFL/AFL Premiership players